The 1986 FIFA World Cup qualification UEFA Group 5 was a UEFA qualifying group for the 1986 FIFA World Cup. The group comprised Austria, Cyprus, Hungary and Netherlands.

The group was won by Hungary, who qualified for the 1986 FIFA World Cup. The Netherlands were the runners-up determined on goals scored and entered the UEFA play-off stage.

Standings

Results

Goalscorers

4 goals

 Wim Kieft

3 goals

 Walter Schachner

2 goals

 Lajos Détári
 Márton Esterházy
 József Kiprich
 Tibor Nyilasi
 Dick Schoenaker

1 goal

 Martin Gisinger
 Peter Hrstic
 Toni Polster
 Herbert Prohaska
 Gerald Willfurth
 Paschalis Christophorou
 Kostas Foti
 Panayiotis Marangos
 József Kardos
 Antal Nagy
 Antal Róth
 László Szokolai
 Peter Houtman
 Erwin Koeman
 Marco van Basten
 Rob de Wit

1 own goal

 Nikos Pantziaras (playing against the Netherlands)
 Michel Valke (playing against Austria)

References

External links
Fifa.com page
Rsssf page
Results and Scorers

5
1984–85 in Hungarian football
1985–86 in Hungarian football
1984–85 in Dutch football
1985–86 in Dutch football
1984–85 in Austrian football
1985–86 in Austrian football
1984–85 in Cypriot football
1985–86 in Cypriot football
1983–84 in Austrian football
1983–84 in Cypriot football
Q